The captains regent (Italian: Capitani reggenti) are the two heads of state of the Republic of San Marino. They are elected every six months by the Grand and General Council, the country's legislative body. Normally the Regents are chosen from parties in coalition and they serve a six-month term. The investiture of the captains regent takes place on 1 April and 1 October every year. This tradition dates back at least to 1243.

The practice of dual heads of government (diarchy) is derived directly from the customs of the Roman Republic, equivalent to the consuls of ancient Rome. To be noted that Captains Regent are not heads of government, but only heads of state without executive power.

History 

The establishment of the regency took place during the first half of the 13th century, when they had the role of managing justice, a task similar to competence of magistrates. During that period they were called consuls, which derived from ancient Rome. The first two known consuls were elected on 12 December 1243 by the Grand and General Council with a six-month term which is still used today.

At the end of the 13th century, the name of the institution started to change, as one took the title of "captain" and the other one of "defender", then in 1317 they became captain and rector. One usually belonged to the upper class, to guarantee the possession of skills necessary to govern the Republic with competence, and one to the working class.

In 1972, a law was passed to abolish all the restrictions which prevented women from taking public positions. A woman, Maria Lea Pedini-Angelini, was elected Captain Regent for the first time on 1 April 1981. On 1 April 2017, for the first time two women, Vanessa D'Ambrosio and Mimma Zavoli, concurrently occupied the posts of Captains Regent, until their term ended on 1 October 2017. 
As of 1 April 2020, after electing its 18th female Captain Regent, San Marino is the country with most female heads of state in the world (however, many other countries have had a female head of state for longer than the combined 10.5 years of these 18 captains regent).

Election 
The Captains Regent are elected every six months by the Grand and General Council, and they usually belong to opposite parties to grant a minimal amount of balance and an equal supervision. The electoral procedure is disciplined by a 1945 law, which is mainly based on the Leges Statutae Republicae Sancti Marini of 1600.

The pair is elected if it achieves an absolute majority; there is a second ballot if no pair gets enough votes.

Eligibility 
To be eligible for election the candidate should have the following requirements:
 Citizenship from birth (jus sanguinis)
 Be at least 25 years old
 Be a member of the Grand and General Council
 Not have been captain regent in the last three years

Investiture 
The investiture ceremony rakes place 1 April and 1 October every year, and is described by Leges Statutae Republicae Sancti Marini. In the morning, in the Piazza della Libertà, the Sammarinese Armed Forces are assembled and the flag raising ceremony takes place. The newly elected Captains Regent then proceed from the Palazzo Pubblico to the Basilica of San Marino where a religious rite is celebrated by the bishop of Bishop of San Marino. The entourage returns to the Palazzo, where the official address is made and the elected Captains Regent are sworn in according to the oath describes in the Statutes of 1600. The outgoing Captains Regent place the collar of the Order of San Marino on the new Captain Regents, finalizing the transfer of power. Procession of then head to Palazzo Valloni. Finally, the Armed Forces assemble once more and the flag is lowered.

Power 
The Regency is considered the supreme office of the Republic. The Captains Regent are the head of state, a function which they carry out as a single body, with a reciprocal right of veto. They have the right to be addressed with the honorific title of Excellency.

The Captains Regent are impartial and their power is mainly symbolic, as their main duty is to represent the country and to guarantee the constitutional order. They supervise the Grand and General Council, the Congress of State and the Council of XII but without any right to vote or to decide. They dissolve the parliament when the legislature is over or when it is unable to form a stable government. The Captains Regent also have the power to promulgate and order the publication of the laws approved by the Grand and General Council.

Regency Syndicate 
The Captains Regent cannot be prosecuted in any way during their mandate, at the end of which they are subject to the Regency Syndicate. This judgement, established by the Statues in 1499, is now fulfilled by the Guarantors' Panel on the Constitutionality of Rules, following the revision of the Declaration on the Citizens' Rights. The procedure provides that, within fifteen days after the conclusion of their mandate, every citizen registered in the electoral lists may submit claims against the Captains Regent "for what they have and have not done" during their mandate.

List of captains regent

See also
San Marino
Politics of San Marino
Grand and General Council
Congress of State

References

External links
 Republic of San Marino - Captains Regent

Politics of San Marino

1243 establishments in Europe
Collective heads of state